Johnny Cash! The Man, His World, His Music is a 1969 American musical documentary film. The film examines Cash as he visits various locations in 1968, including his hometown of Dyess, Arkansas (in one scene, he plays the song "Busted" on acoustic guitar inside his abandoned childhood home). The film contains no narration, but rather contains audio and video footage of Cash playing in concert and talking with people on tour with him. By this point, Cash was married to June Carter and had been more sober than he had been in years, despite the fact that he still struggled with addiction. The film was released to capitalize on Cash's success by way of his At Folsom Prison album and to promote his upcoming television variety show on ABC.

The film was directed by Rob Elfstrom, with whom Cash would collaborate on his 1973 religious film The Gospel Road, which is shot in a similar style, using non-actors and is also filmed on location.

Cast
Johnny Cash - Himself
Anita Carter - Herself
June Carter Cash - Herself (as June Carter)
Helen Carter - Herself
Mother Maybelle Carter - Herself
Bob Dylan - Himself
Marshall Grant - Himself
Bob Johnston - Himself
Merle Kilgore - Himself
Carl Perkins - Himself
Bob Wootton - Himself

External links
  
 

1960s musical films
1960s English-language films